Sir Alfred Hopkinson (28 June 1851 – 11 November 1939) was an English lawyer, academic and politician who served as a Member of Parliament (MP) for two three-year periods, separated by nearly thirty years.

He was the son of John Hopkinson, a mechanical engineer, and among his brothers were John Hopkinson, a physicist and electrical engineer, and Edward Hopkinson, an electrical engineer and MP. He first stood for election to the House of Commons at the 1885 general election, when he was the unsuccessful Liberal Party candidate in Manchester East. He was unsuccessful again as a Liberal Unionist candidate at the 1892 general election, when he stood in Manchester South-West.

Hopkinson finally won a seat at the 1895 general election, when he was elected as MP for Cricklade in Wiltshire. He resigned from Parliament in February 1898, by the procedural device of accepting appointment as Steward of the Chiltern Hundreds.

Hopkinson was Vice-Chancellor of the Victoria University from 1901 to 15 July 1903 and then of the Victoria University of Manchester until 1913. In December 1914 he was appointed to the Committee on Alleged German Outrages, which in May 1915 reported on German war crimes against civilians during the invasion of Belgium in the opening months of World War I.

He received the honorary degree of Doctor of Laws (LL.D) from the University of Glasgow in June 1901. He was awarded a knighthood in 1910.

He returned to Parliament in March 1926, when he won a by-election for the Combined English Universities as a Conservative. He did not contest the 1929 general election.

A sculpture of him by John Cassidy was exhibited at Manchester in 1912. His son Austin Hopkinson also became a Member of Parliament. One of his daughters married Sir Gerald Hurst M.P. and another, Ellen, married George Harwood M.P. A granddaughter, Georgina Harwood, became a well-known biographer under her married name of Georgina Battiscombe.

References

Further reading
Hopkinson, Mary & Ewing, Irene, Lady (eds.) (1948) John and Alice Hopkinson 1824-1910. London: Farmer & Sons, printers

External links 
 
 
 
 

1851 births
1939 deaths
Liberal Party (UK) parliamentary candidates
Liberal Unionist Party MPs for English constituencies
UK MPs 1895–1900
Conservative Party (UK) MPs for English constituencies
Members of the Parliament of the United Kingdom for the Combined English Universities
UK MPs 1924–1929
Vice-Chancellors of the Victoria University of Manchester
People associated with the Victoria University of Manchester
English legal scholars
Alfred
Members of the Parliament of the United Kingdom for Cricklade